Gagea granatellii is a Mediterranean and Black Sea species of plants in the lily family. It is native to Spain incl. Balearic Islands, France incl. Corsica, Italy (incl Sardinia + Sicily), Libya, Greece, Romania, and  Crimea.

Gagea granatellii is a bulb-forming herb with yellow flowers and red stems.

References

External links
Fflora di Sardegnaflora, Gagea granatellii (Parl.) Parl. color photos
Gagea granatellii - L'herbiel de Gabriel  numerous color photos

granatellii
Flora of Europe
Flora of Libya
Plants described in 1839